This is a list of regions of Burundi by Human Development Index as of 2023 with data for the year 2021.

References 

Burundi
Human Development Index
Human Development Index,regions